Richards may refer to:

Richards (surname)

In places:
 Richards, New South Wales, Australia
 Richards, Missouri, United States
 Richards, Texas, United States

In other uses:
 Richards (lunar crater), on the Moon